Hamid El Kasri (born 1961) is a Moroccan Gnawa musician traditionally considered a maâlem, or "master musician". Born in Ksar El Kebir, Morocco, he now lives in Rabat. He began training at age seven, taught by Maâlem Abdelouahed Stitou and Maâlem Alouane. El Kasri is famed for his deep, intense voice, which has made him one of the most sought-after maâlems, both in Morocco and abroad. In addition to singing, he performs on the guembri, a three-stringed bass instrument. He is noted for having blended the Gnawa rhythms of the north and south of the Morocco.

Performances and Collaborations 
Having made a name for himself outside Morocco, El Kasri performs regularly with foreign musicians. Several of these occasions have been at the Gnaoua World Music Festival. In 2004, he played at the festival with Joe Zawinul, later performing there with Karim Ziad in 2010, and Hamayun Kahn and Shahin Shahida in 2011. In 2018, El Kasri opened the Gnaoua World Music Festival with Snarky Puppy, a Brooklyn-based jazz jam band.

In 2018, El Kasri performed with Jacob Collier at the BBC Proms, as a part of Prom 7. Later that year, he was featured on Collier's album Djesse Vol. 1, appearing on the song "Everlasting Motion".

References 

1961 births
20th-century Moroccan musicians
20th-century Moroccan male singers
21st-century Moroccan musicians
21st-century Moroccan male singers
Living people
People from Ksar el-Kebir